Glostrup is a Danish town in Region Hovedstaden, forming one of the western suburbs of Copenhagen. It is the administrative seat of Glostrup Municipality, with an estimated population of 22,357 .

During the 20th century Glostrup developed from a small railroad town into a modern middle class suburb. The population reached a peak during the 1970s flight from central Copenhagen, but has since stabilized. While most of Copenhagens western suburbs are dominated by public housing projects, Glostrups mix is around the Danish average. A series of large companies, e.g. Grontmij's and Motorola's Danish sections, along with NKT Holding and Pandora are situated in the area. Along with the surrounding municipalities, it forms the center of Copenhagen's productive industry. Glostrup Municipality has a total of 21,200 jobs in the private and public sectors combined.

Glostrup is also home to a series of public offices and institutions, e.g. Københavns Vestegn Police Departement and Glostrup Court, covering the western and northern suburbs of Copenhagen. Glostrup Hospital was inaugurated in 1958 and employs 3,200 people.

History

Early history
The village of Glostrup was established some time between 1000 and 1197 and is named after its founder Glob. The village is first mentioned between 1186 and 1197 as Glostorp, but Glostrup church is from around 1150, indicating that a well-established community was already found at the site at this point. Most of the privately owned land came under Roskilde Cathedral over the next couple of centuries but was confiscated by the Crown after the Reformation in 1536.

Sources from 1682 indicate that the soil in the area was quite fertile as the village consisted of eight farms and 13 houses. Most of the smallholders worked for the farmers.

In 1773, when the new Roskilde Road was constructed between Copenhagen and Roskilde was constructed, it became the main road of the area.

After the railroad
Glostrup was a station on the new railway, Denmark's first, which opened between Copenhagen and Roskilde.  Glostrup changed character and the population grew significantly during the last decades of the century. A poorhouse was established in 1862 and it was followed by a pharmacy in 1864, a new school in 1876 and telephone connection in 1886.

20th century
An increasing number of industrial enterprises also established in the area. Lever Brothers opened a soap factory in 1924.

Housing
Glostrup Housing Association was founded in 1943 as a part of the expansion of the Danish capital and as an answer to the growing housing demand in general. The growing population combined with the already miserable living conditions in the central city led to a series of national plans to expand the number of housing units. 
While the supporters of the Glostrup Housing Association, predominantly Social Democrats, stressed the need to maintain local control of the expansion plans, opponents criticised the building of public housing in the municipality.
The largest project of the association was the building of 1,200 housing units in relation to the building of Glostrup Hospital. They were built between 1956 and 1965, ultimately defining Glostrup as a suburb rather than a village. Other large plans included the erection of Avedøre Stationsby (Transferred to Hvidovre Municipality in 1974) and the Hvissinge Plan.

Transport
Transport in Glostrup has historically been dominated by the railroad station opened on the first Danish railroad in 1847 between Copenhagen and Roskilde. During the expansion of the motorways around Copenhagen in the port-war period Glostrup became a central note in the new transport geography of the larger Copenhagen area.

The railroad station
While the railroad originally had a halt in Glostrup, a station was built in 1918 to serve the local economy. It was designed by Heinrich Wenck. 
In 1953 the S-train network was expanded to Glostrup.

Notable people

Niels Simonsen Glostrup (died 1639), priest, the seventh Lutheran Bishop of Oslo
Just Michael Aagaard (1757–1819), merchant and konditori-owner
Holger Marius Nielsen (1905–1993) official of the Danish Ministry of Education.
Preben Uglebjerg (1931–1968), actor and entertainer
Jørgen Erik Nielsen (1933-2006) associate professor at the University of Copenhagen
Eva Steiness (born 1941), physician, former university professor, now CEO of Serodus
Werner Knudsen (born 1953), computer scientist, composer and IT books writer, lives here
Søren Bundgaard (born 1956), singer
Dicte (born 1966), musician and songwriter
Svend Olling (born 1967), diplomat, Danish Ambassador to Turkey and Azerbaijan since 2016
Nicolaj Kopernikus (born 1967), actor
Margrethe Vestager (born 1968), politician, European Commissioner for Competition since 2014
Amin Jensen (born 1970), actor, comedian and TV host
Anita Lerche (born 1973), singer-songwriter, composer and actress
Christina Liljenberg Halstrøm (born 1977), architect and furniture designer

Sport

Mogens Frey (born 1941), cyclist, Olympic winner
Tom Køhlert (born 1947), football player and manager
Søren Busk (born 1953), footballer
Hans Kjeld Rasmussen (born 1954), sports shooter, Olympic winner
Jan Sørensen (born 1955), footballer
Lars Olsen (born 1961), football player and manager
Claus Christiansen (born 1967), footballer
Jens Eriksen (born 1969), badminton player, Olympic medalist
René Henriksen (born 1969), footballer
Morten Wieghorst (born 1971), football player and manager
Ronnie Ekelund (born 1972), footballer
Michael Johansen (born 1972), footballer
Thomas Hansen (born 1976), cricketer 
Lasse Schøne (born 1986), footballer
Madeleine Dupont (born 1987), curler
Anita Madsen (born 1995), figure skater

See also
Glostrup station

References

External links

Municipality's official website
glostrupsogn.dk

Municipal seats in the Capital Region of Denmark
Municipal seats of Denmark
Copenhagen metropolitan area
Cities and towns in the Capital Region of Denmark
Glostrup Municipality